Borshchovo is a rural locality (a selo) in Pogarsky District, Bryansk Oblast, Russia. The population was 686 as of 2013. There are 8 streets.

Geography 
Borshchovo is located 14 km southwest of Pogar (the district's administrative centre) by road. Lobki is the nearest rural locality.

References 

Rural localities in Pogarsky District